Mangita Devi Yadav (born 6 April 1981) is an Indian politician. She was member of the Bihar legislative assembly 2015-2020 representing Runnisaidpur Vidhan Sabha constituency in Sitamarhi district.

References 

Women members of the Bihar Legislative Assembly
Living people
1981 births
Bihar MLAs 2015–2020
Rashtriya Janata Dal politicians
21st-century Indian women politicians